Sampli (Saimply Sahib) is a small village in the Bassi Pathana block of Fatehgarh Sahib district, in the Indian state of Punjab.  This village is around 25 kilometres from Chandigarh-the capital of Punjab, 45 km from Patiala-academic city of Punjab, and about 75 km from Ludhiana-industrial city of Punjab.

Demographics
The population mainly consists of Sikhs and 2-3 families of Muslims.

It is a religious village and known for popular Gurudwara Saimply Sahib. Brahm Giani Sant Baba Jaimal Singh Ji built this Gurudwara Sahib. Sant Baba Banta is now in charge of Gurughar. Prominent figures Sant Jarnail Singh Bhindranwale and Giani Jail Singh (Ex President of India) were frequent visitors to this village.

References

Fatehgarh Sahib
Villages in Fatehgarh Sahib district